Serhiy Lashchenko (Ukrainian: Сергій Лащенко; 21 June 1987 – 8 April 2015), also spelled as Sergii Lashchenko and Sergei Lascenko, was a Ukrainian kickboxer. He was a K-1 and Superkombat Heavyweight.

Lashchenko won the Superkombat Tournament Championship at SUPERKOMBAT World Grand Prix 2011 Final, stopping Ismael Londt with punches to the head in the first round and becoming the first Superkombat World Grand Prix champion in the process.

In his prime he was considered one of the best heavyweight kickboxers in the world, with a career-high ranking at #6 in the world in the LiverKick.com rankings.

Career

2006-2008
Lascenko began his kickboxing career in 2006, mostly fighting under Muay Thai rules. After becoming the Ukrainian Heavyweight Muay Thai Champion in 2007, he went on to win The Honor of Soldier tournament in Moscow, Russia later that year. The tournament kicked off on October 10, 2007 with sixteen competitors. In the opening round, Lascenko beat Sultan Babaev by unanimous decision to qualify for the final eight on December 5. There, he dispatched Andrei Kirsanov via split decision in the quarter-finals, and Yaroslav Zakharov by technical knockout in the semis before taking an extra round unanimous decision over Alexander Oleynik in the final.

On October 27, 2008, he defeated Stepan Kirlish to win the +91 kg gold medal at the 8th Ukrainian Muay Thai Cup.

He made his K-1 debut on November 22, 2008 at the K-1 World Grand Prix 2008 in Riga. He was eliminated from the eight-man tournament at the first stage by Mindaugas Sakalauskas on unanimous decision (10-9, 10–9, 10-9) after an extra round.

2009
On April 13, 2009, Lascenko once again won the +91 kg gold medal at the Ukrainian Muay Thai Championships.

Following this, he entered the IFMA European Amateur Muay Thai Championships in Liepāja, Latvia. He beat Alexei Kudin by decision in the semi-finals on May 20 and Igors Goncarovs by TKO in the final on May 22. Just a day later, he participated in his second K-1 tournament, the K-1 World Grand Prix 2009 in Łódź, in Poland. He made it to the final but lost by knockout to Zabit Samedov, after he had beaten Noel Cadet by TKO and Dmitrij Bezus in the quarters and semis, respectively.

He was given another chance to qualify for the 2009 K-1 World Grand Prix final 16 when he was invited to the K-1 World Grand Prix 2009 in Tokyo Final 16 Qualifying GP in Japan. In the quarter-finals of the tournament, Lascenko faced Sebastian Ciobanu and was able to take a unanimous decision (30-29, 30–28, 30-28) over the Romanian. In the semis, he knocked out Brice Guidon in round two after dropping him with a knee strike to the body in the first. Advancing to the final, he came up against Daniel Ghiţă who stopped him with low kicks inside the first round.

He rebound from this loss by beating Dmitrij Bezus to take the +91 kg gold medal at the 8th Ukrainian Muay Thai Cup on September 21, 2009.

2010
In 2010, Lascenko and his teammate Artur Kyshenko left the Captain Odessa gym in Ukraine to move to the famed Mike's Gym in Amsterdam, Netherlands.

On April 3, 2010, Lascenko defeated Takumi Sato by unanimous decision (30-29, 30–29, 30-28) at the K-1 World Grand Prix 2010 in Yokohama.

After this, he was invited to compete in the tournament on K-1 World Grand Prix 2010 in Bucharest on May 21, 2010. He was unable to make it past the first stage, as Freddy Kemayo beat him by unanimous decision in the quarter-finals.

He would also go on to lose his next two fights after this, dropping decisions to Alexei Kudin on July 30 in Minsk, Belarus, and Ismael Londt on October 22 in Kazan, Russia. He ended the year with a first-round knockout win over Vasile Popovici in Chişinău, Moldova on December 11.

2011
On May 21, 2011, he took part in the SuperKombat World Grand Prix I 2011 in Bucharest, Romania. It would be the first of four, four-man qualifying tournaments held throughout the year; the winners of the four events would qualify for another four-man Grand Prix at the end of the year to determine the overall champion. In the semi-finals, he stopped Dževad Poturak with a knee to the body in round two, and in the final he KO'd Roman Kleibl with a right hook, also in the second round. This win qualified him for the finals at the end of the year.

Lascenko was expected to face Rico Verhoeven at the K-1 World Grand Prix 2011 in Nanjing Final 16 on October 29. However, the event was cancelled with K-1 experiencing severe financial problems.

The SuperKombat World Grand Prix Final 2011 was held in Darmstadt, Germany on November 19. In the semis, he defeated Erhan Deniz (who he had already beaten back in 2008) via doctor stoppage in round 3. He then advanced into the final against Ismael Londt, the man who had beaten him a year previously. It looked as though the result would be the same this time also as Londt forced Lascenko into the corner and dropped him with a flurry of punches. Lascenko beat the count but was put against the ropes again and, initially, looked overwhelmed. However, Lascenko then dramatically KO'd Londt. With his back against the ropes, he let go his own punch furry and hit Londt with three punches to the head, knocking him out and becoming the first SuperKombat World Grand Prix champion in the process.

2012
He faced Hesdy Gerges at the K-1 World Grand Prix 2012 in Tokyo Final 16 on October 14, 2012. Lascenko was unable to land punches while Gerges battered him with low kicks, and lost via unanimous decision.

He was scheduled to have his rubber match with Ismael Londt on November 10, 2012 in Craiova, Romania at the SuperKombat World Grand Prix 2012 Final Elimination, which is the quarter-finals of the SuperKombat World Grand Prix 2012. However, he was forced to pull out of the bout due to injuries sustained in his fight with Gerges and replaced by Daniel Sam. Strangely enough, though, he was then added back to the card to fight Benjamin Adegbuyi, replacing Alexey Ignashov. He was floored twice by Adegbuyi in round one, causing the referee to stop the bout.

He rematched Freddy Kemayo in a tournament reserve bout at the SuperKombat World Grand Prix 2012 Final in Bucharest, Romania on December 22, 2012 and lost via split decision after three rounds.

He rematched Dževad Poturak in the reserve bout for the K-1 World Grand Prix 2012 Final in Zagreb, Croatia on March 15, 2013 and lost via unanimous decision.

He snapped a four-fight losing streak by taking a unanimous decision win over Tomasz Nowak at the K-1 World Grand Prix 2013 in Moldova - Light Heavyweight Tournament in Chișinău, Moldova on March 30, 2013.

2013
He was scheduled to fight Antonio Sousa on April 13, 2013 in the K-1 World Qualification - K-1 World MAX Elimination super fight but was pulled out because of K-1 financial problems.

Death
Lascenko was pronounced dead on April 8, 2015 at the Odessa Jewish Hospital in Ukraine after being shot multiple times. According to the Press Service of the Ministry of Interior of the Odessa Oblast, Lascenko was shot in the carotid artery in Odessa during the Deribasovskaya Street night shooting. According to initial information, the cause of quarrel was a woman and generated a conflict between Odessa citizens and a group of eight Caucasians. He was survived by a wife and an 11-month old child - Platon.

Titles

Amateur
International Federation of Muaythai Amateurs
2008 Busan TAFISA World Games IFMA Amateur Muay Thai +91 kg bronze medalist 
2009 IFMA European Amateur Muay Thai Championships +91 kg gold medalist 
Ukrainian Muay Thai Championships
2009 Ukrainian Muay Thai Championships +91 kg gold medalist 
Ukrainian Muay Thai Cup
7th Ukrainian Muay Thai Cup +91 kg gold medalist  (2007)
8th Ukrainian Muay Thai Cup +91 kg gold medalist  (2008)

Professional
The Honor of Soldier
2007 Honor of Soldier heavyweight tournament winner
K-1
2009 K-1 World Grand Prix in Łódź finalist
2009 K-1 World Grand Prix in Tokyo Final 16 Qualifying GP finalist
SUPERKOMBAT Fighting Championship 
2011 SUPERKOMBAT World Grand Prix Final Tournament Winner 
2011 SUPERKOMBAT World Grand Prix I Tournament Winner 
2011 Special Prize
First SUPERKOMBAT World Grand Prix Champion
KOK 
2014 KOK World GP 2014 Heavyweight Tournament Champion

Kickboxing record

|-  bgcolor="#CCFFCC"
| 2014-10-17 ||Win ||align=left| Tomasz Szepkowski || KOK World GP 2014 in Gdańsk, Final || Gdańsk, Poland || KO || 1 || 
|-
! style=background:white colspan=9 |
|-  bgcolor="#CCFFCC"
| 2014-10-17 ||Win ||align=left| Michal Turynski || KOK World GP 2014 in Gdańsk, Semi Finals || Gdańsk, Poland || Ext. R. Decision (Unanimous)|| 4 || 3:00
|-  bgcolor="CCFFCC"
| 2014-06-06 || Win ||align=left|  Dimitris Delis || FFC13: Jurković vs. Tavares || Zadar, Croatia || TKO (Towel Thrown) || 2 || 1:40
|-  bgcolor="#FFBBBB"
| 2013-05-10 ||Loss ||align=left| Mladen Brestovac || FFC04: Perak vs. Joni || Zadar,Croatia || Decision (Unanimous) || 3 ||3:00
|-  bgcolor="CCFFCC"
| 2013-03-30 || Win ||align=left| Tomasz Nowak || K-1 World Grand Prix 2013 in Moldova - Light Heavyweight Tournament || Chișinău, Moldova || Decision (Unanimous) || 3 || 3:00
|-  bgcolor="#FFBBBB"
| 2013-03-15 || Loss ||align=left| Dževad Poturak || K-1 World Grand Prix 2012 Final, Reserve Fight || Zagreb, Croatia || Decision (unanimous) || 3 || 3:00
|-  bgcolor="#FFBBBB"
| 2012-12-22 || Loss ||align=left| Freddy Kemayo || SUPERKOMBAT World Grand Prix 2012 Final, Reserve Bout || Bucharest, Romania || Decision (Split) || 3 || 3:00
|-  bgcolor="#FFBBBB"
| 2012-11-10 || Loss ||align=left| Benjamin Adegbuyi || SUPERKOMBAT World Grand Prix 2012 Final Elimination, Quarter Finals || Craiova, Romania || TKO (Referee Stoppage) || 1 || 2:12
|-  bgcolor="#FFBBBB"
| 2012-10-14 || Loss ||align=left| Hesdy Gerges || K-1 World Grand Prix 2012 in Tokyo Final 16, First Round || Tokyo, Japan || Decision (Unanimous) || 3 || 3:00
|-  bgcolor="#CCFFCC"
| 2012-07-21 || Win ||align=left| Damian Garcia || It's Showtime 59 || Tenerife, Spain || KO || 1 ||
|-  bgcolor="#CCFFCC"
| 2012-05-27 || Win ||align=left| Rico Verhoeven || K-1 World MAX 2012 World Championship Tournament Final 16, Super Fight || Madrid, Spain || Extra round decision (split) || 4 || 3:00
|-  bgcolor="#CCFFCC"
| 2012-05-12 || Win ||align=left| Salah Edine Kandoussi || Siam Gym Belgium presents It's Showtime 56 || Kortrijk, Belgium 3 || KO (Punches) || ||
|-  bgcolor="#FFBBBB"
| 2012-03-10 || Loss ||align=left| Daniel Ghiţă || Cro Cop Final Fight || Zagreb, Croatia || KO (Right High Kick)|| 3 || 0:49
|-  bgcolor="#CCFFCC"
| 2011-11-19 || Win ||align=left| Ismael Londt || SUPERKOMBAT World Grand Prix 2011 Final, Final || Darmstadt, Germany || KO (punches) ||1 || 2:04
|-
! style=background:white colspan=9 |
|-
|-  bgcolor="#CCFFCC"
| 2011-11-19 || Win ||align=left| Erhan Deniz || SUPERKOMBAT World Grand Prix 2011 Final, Semi Finals || Darmstadt, Germany || TKO (doctor stoppage) || 3 || 0:53
|-  bgcolor="#CCFFCC"
| 2011-05-21 || Win ||align=left| Roman Kleibl || SUPERKOMBAT World Grand Prix I 2011, Final || Bucharest, Romania || KO (right hook) || 2 || 2:14
|-
! style=background:white colspan=9 |
|-
|-  bgcolor="#CCFFCC"
| 2011-05-21 || Win ||align=left| Dževad Poturak || SUPERKOMBAT World Grand Prix I 2011, Semi Finals || Bucharest, Romania || KO (right knee to the body) || 2 || 2:00
|-  bgcolor="#CCFFCC"
| 2010-12-11 || Win ||align=left| Vasile Popovici || KOK World GP 2010 in Chisinau || Chişinău, Moldova || KO || 1 || 1:52
|-  bgcolor="#FFBBBB"
| 2010-10-22 || Loss ||align=left| Ismael Londt || Tatneft Arena World Cup 2010 final (+91 kg) || Kazan, Russia || Decision (unanimous) || 3 || 3:00
|-  bgcolor="#FFBBBB"
| 2010-07-30 || Loss ||align=left| Alexei Kudin || Fight Club "The Octopus" || Minsk, Belarus || Decision (unanimous) || 3 || 3:00
|-  bgcolor="#FFBBBB"
| 2010-05-21 || Loss ||align=left| Freddy Kemayo || K-1 World Grand Prix 2010 in Bucharest, Quarter Final || Bucharest, Romania || Decision (unanimous) || 3 || 3:00
|-  bgcolor="#CCFFCC"
| 2010-04-03 || Win ||align=left| Takumi Sato || K-1 World Grand Prix 2010 in Yokohama || Yokohama, Japan || Decision (unanimous) || 3 || 3:00
|-  bgcolor="#CCFFCC"
| 2009-10-23 || Win ||align=left| Igor Bugaenko || Tatneft Arena European Cup 2009 || Kazan, Russia || Decision (unanimous) || 5 || 3:00
|-  bgcolor="#CCFFCC"
| 2009-09-21 || Win ||align=left| Dmytro Bezus || 9th Ukrainian Muaythai Cup || Poltava, Ukraine || || ||
|-
! style=background:white colspan=9 |
|-
|-  bgcolor="#FFBBBB"
| 2009-08-11 || Loss ||align=left| Daniel Ghiţă || K-1 World Grand Prix 2009 in Tokyo Final 16 Qualifying GP, Final || Tokyo, Japan || KO (right low kick) || 1 || 2:19 
|-
! style=background:white colspan=9 |
|-
|-  bgcolor="#CCFFCC"
| 2009-08-11 || Win ||align=left| Brice Guidon || K-1 World Grand Prix 2009 in Tokyo Final 16 Qualifying GP, Semi Finals || Tokyo, Japan || KO (right cross) || 2 || 0:34
|-  bgcolor="#CCFFCC"
| 2009-08-11 || Win ||align=left| Sebastian Ciobanu || K-1 World Grand Prix 2009 in Tokyo Final 16 Qualifying GP, Quarter Finals || Tokyo, Japan || Decision (unanimous) || 3 || 3:00
|-  bgcolor="#FFBBBB"
| 2009-05-23 || Loss ||align=left| Zabit Samedov || K-1 World Grand Prix 2009 in Łódź, Final || Łódź, Poland || TKO (referee stoppage) || 3 || 2:05 
|-
! style=background:white colspan=9 |
|-
|-  bgcolor="#CCFFCC"
| 2009-05-23 || Win ||align=left| Dmytro Bezus || K-1 World Grand Prix 2009 in Łódź, Semi Finals || Łódź, Poland || TKO (referee stoppage) || 1 || 2:29
|-  bgcolor="#CCFFCC"
| 2009-05-23 || Win ||align=left| Noel Cadet || K-1 World Grand Prix 2009 in Łódź, Quarter Finals || Łódź, Poland || TKO (referee stoppage) || 1 || 2:46
|-  bgcolor="#CCFFCC"
| 2009-05-22 || Win ||align=left| Igors Goncarovs || IFMA European Amateur Muaythai championships || Liepāja, Latvia || TKO (referee stoppage) || 3 ||
|-
! style=background:white colspan=9 |
|-
|-  bgcolor="#CCFFCC"
| 2009-05-20 || Win ||align=left| Alexei Kudin || IFMA European Amateur Muaythai championships || Liepāja, Latvia || Decision || 4 || 2:00
|-  bgcolor="#CCFFCC"
| 2009-04-13 || Win ||align=left| Dmytro Bezus || Ukrainian Muaythai championships 2009 || Odessa, Ukraine || || ||
|-
! style=background:white colspan=9 |
|-
|-  bgcolor="#FFBBBB"
| 2009-02-19 || Loss ||align=left| Vladimir Mineev || Tatneft Cup 2009 4th selection for 1/8 final || Kazan, Russia || Decision || 3 || 3:00
|-  bgcolor="#FFBBBB"
| 2008-11-22 || Loss ||align=left| Mindaugas Sakalauskas || K-1 World Grand Prix 2008 in Riga, Quarter Finals || Riga, Latvia || Extra round decision (unanimous) || 4 || 3:00
|-  bgcolor="#CCFFCC"
| 2008-10-27 || Win ||align=left| Stepan Kirlish || 8th Ukrainian Muaythai Cup || Mariupol, Ukraine || || ||
|-
! style=background:white colspan=9 |
|-
|-  bgcolor="#FFBBBB"
| 2008-09-30 || Loss ||align=left| Alexei Kudin || 4th Busan TAFISA World Games || Busan, South Korea || Decision || 5 || 3:00
|-  bgcolor="#CCFFCC"
| 2008-09-28 || Win ||align=left| Erhan Deniz || 4th Busan TAFISA World Games || Busan, South Korea || TKO (referee stoppage) || 3 || 
|-  bgcolor="#CCFFCC"
| 2008-08-04 || Win ||align=left| Dmytro Bezus || 1st Stage of Ukrainian Muaythai Cup 2008 || Mykolaiv, Ukraine || || ||
|-  bgcolor="#FFBBBB"
| 2008-05-29 || Loss ||align=left| Alexei Kudin || WBKF World Tournament (+93 kg) @ Club Arbat, semi finals || Moscow, Russia || Decision (unanimous) || 3 || 3:00
|-  bgcolor="#CCFFCC"
| 2007-12-21 || Win ||align=left| Oleksandr Oliynyk || The Honor of Soldier tournament || Kharkiv, Ukraine || Extra round decision (unanimous) || 4 || 3:00
|-
! style=background:white colspan=9 |
|-
|-  bgcolor="#CCFFCC"
| 2007-12-12 || Win ||align=left| Yaroslav Zakharov || WBKF championship (+93 kg) 1/2 final @ Club Arbat || Moscow, Russia || TKO || 5 || 
|-  bgcolor="#CCFFCC"
| 2007-12-05 || Win ||align=left| Andrei Kirsanov || WBKF championship (+93 kg) 1/4 final @ Club Arbat || Moscow, Russia || Decision (split) || 5 || 3:00
|-  bgcolor="#CCFFCC"
| 2007-10-10 || Win ||align=left| Sultan Babaev || WBKF championship (+93 kg) Elimination @ Club Arbat || Moscow, Russia || Decision (unanimous) || 5 || 3:00
|-  bgcolor="#CCFFCC"
| 2007-04-04 || Win ||align=left| Denis Podolyachin || WBKF (+93 kg) @ Club Arbat || Moscow, Russia || Decision (unanimous) || 5 || 3:00
|-
| colspan=9 | Legend:

See also
 List of male kickboxers

References

1987 births
2015 deaths
Ukrainian male kickboxers
Heavyweight kickboxers
Ukrainian Muay Thai practitioners
People from Pavlohrad
Ukrainian expatriates in the Netherlands
Deaths by firearm in Ukraine
Male murder victims
Ukrainian murder victims
People murdered in Ukraine
SUPERKOMBAT kickboxers
Sportspeople from Dnipropetrovsk Oblast